SM Farooq is a Bangladeshi politician. He was elected a member of parliament from Bogra-9 in 1979 Bangladeshi general election as the Bangladesh Nationalist Party candidate.

Career 
SM Farooq was elected a Member of Parliament from Bogra-9 constituency as an Bangladesh Nationalist Party candidate in the 1979 Bangladeshi general election.

References 

Living people
Year of birth missing (living people)
Bangladesh Nationalist Party politicians
2nd Jatiya Sangsad members